The Chew-Powell House is a historic building in the Blenheim section of Gloucester Township, Camden County, New Jersey.  It was built in 1688 by James Whitall. The Chew-Powell-Wallens Burying Ground, next to the house, is considered to be the oldest cemetery in the township, and it reportedly contains the remains of early settlers, soldiers of the Revolutionary and Civil Wars and Leni Lenape Native Americans.

The structure was once well-preserved but now sits in disarray, is privately owned and maintained, currently serves as a private residence.  It was listed in the New Jersey Department of Environmental Protection's Historic Preservation Office in 1974 (ID# 957), and the National Register of Historic Places three months later in 1975 (NR reference #: 75001127).

See also
List of the oldest buildings in New Jersey
National Register of Historic Places listings in Camden County, New Jersey

References

Gloucester Township, New Jersey
Houses completed in 1688
Houses in Camden County, New Jersey
Houses on the National Register of Historic Places in New Jersey
National Register of Historic Places in Camden County, New Jersey
New Jersey Register of Historic Places
1688 establishments in New Jersey